The County Councils Network is a special interest group within the Local Government Association. Its 36 members are all 23 English county councils and 13 unitary authority councils. The network is the national voice for counties, and has released a significant report containing ambitious policy proposals on behalf of county councils and unitary councils in England.

More recently, the CCN has released influential research outlining the funding challenges facing local government , alongside original research on planning, social mobility, and levelling up.

The County Councils Network works on a cross-party basis, with members of its management committee drawn from all three major parties. The current Chairman of the County Councils Network is Cllr Tim Oliver, leader of Surrey County Council. It campaigns on funding inequalities for counties, issues surrounding social care and children's services, and on devolution to rural areas, as well as other local government-related topics. The County Councils Network shares offices with the Local Government Association in Westminster.

List of members
County councils

Buckinghamshire County Council
Cambridgeshire County Council
Cumbria County Council
Derbyshire County Council
Devon County Council
Dorset County Council
East Sussex County Council
Essex County Council
Gloucestershire County Council
Hampshire County Council
Hertfordshire County Council
Kent County Council
Lancashire County Council
Leicestershire County Council
Lincolnshire County Council
Norfolk County Council
North Yorkshire County Council
Northamptonshire County Council
Nottinghamshire County Council
Oxfordshire County Council
Somerset County Council
Staffordshire County Council
Suffolk County Council
Surrey County Council
Warwickshire County Council
West Sussex County Council
Worcestershire County Council

Unitary authorities

Central Bedfordshire Council
Cheshire East Council
Cheshire West and Chester Council
Cornwall Council
Durham County Council
East Riding of Yorkshire
Herefordshire Council
Northumberland County Council
Shropshire Council
Wiltshire Council

References

External links
County Councils Network

Local government in the United Kingdom
County councils of England